Dziennik Ustaw or Dziennik Ustaw Rzeczypospolitej Polskiej (abbreviated Dz. U.) is the most important Polish publication of legal acts. It is the only official source of law for promulgation of Polish laws. The publication of this journal is solely the responsibility of the Prime Minister of the Republic of Poland. 'Dziennik Ustaw' traces its history to the 1918 'Dziennik Praw Królestwa Polskiego' and has changed its name several times during its existence.

According to Article 122 of the Constitution of Poland of 1997, The President of the Republic shall sign a bill within 21 days of its submission and shall order its promulgation in the Journal of Laws of the Republic of Poland (Dziennik Ustaw). The matter is further regulated by articles 87 and 234 of the constitution, as well as by the Article 9 of the Act on Publishing Normative Acts and Several Other Legal Acts of 2000. The Dziennik Ustaw is to include such documents as:

Constitution
Acts of the Parliament
Regulations of the President, Council of Ministers, Prime Minister, ministers of administration, members of committees of the Council of Ministers and the National Council of Radio Broadcasting and Television.
uniform acts and amendments
Acts of ratification of international treaties and agreements
Verdicts of the Constitutional Tribunal
Acts of the Council of Ministers abolishing or amending ministerial regulations
Legal acts related to state of war and peace treaties
Legal acts approved by a referendum
Ordinances regarding elections for the Sejm and Senate of Poland
Ordinances regarding presidential elections
Decisions of the Supreme Court of Poland regarding the validity of presidential elections, as well as elections for the Sejm and Senate, as well as on referendums
Notices on errors in previously published laws and acts
Other legal acts, as specified by specific acts of the parliament

See also
 Monitor Polski

References
 An Overview of Polish Law

External links
Internetowy System Aktów Prawnych ISAP Search engine of past issues of 'Dziennik Ustaw', in Polish
Infor Search engine of past and current issues of 'Dziennik Ustaw', 'Monitor Polski', 'Dzienniki Unii Europejskiej', 'Dzienniki Urzędowe' in Polish
Ustawa z dnia 30 grudnia 1950 r. o wydawaniu Dziennika Ustaw Rzeczypospolitej Polskiej i Dziennika Urzędowego Rzeczypospolitej Polskiej "Monitor Polski" (Dz. U. Nr 50, poz. 524, z późn. zm.)
Ustawa z dnia 20 lipca 2000 r. o ogłaszaniu aktów normatywnych i niektórych innych aktów prawnych (Dz. U. z 2017 r. poz. 1523)

Constitutional law
Law of Poland
Law journals
Polish-language journals
Publications established in 1918
Government gazettes